Paris–Rouen, Le Petit Journal Horseless Carriages Contest (Concours du 'Petit Journal' Les Voitures sans Chevaux), was a pioneering city-to-city motoring competition in 1894 which is sometimes described as the world's first competitive motor race.

The contest was organised by the newspaper Le Petit Journal and run from Paris to Rouen in France on 22 July 1894. It was preceded by four days of vehicle exhibition and qualifying events that created great crowds and excitement. The eight  qualifying events started near the Bois de Boulogne and comprised interwoven routes around Paris to select the entrants for the main  event.

The first driver across the finishing line at Rouen was "le Comte de Dion" but he did not win the main prize because his steam vehicle needed a stoker and was thus ineligible. The fastest petrol powered car was a  Peugeot driven by Albert Lemaître. The premier prize, the 5,000 franc Prix du Petit Journal, for 'the competitor whose car comes closest to the ideal' was shared equally by manufacturers Panhard et Levassor and Les fils de Peugeot frères ("The sons of Peugeot brothers"), with vehicles that were 'easy to use'.

1894 – Paris to Rouen

Organisation
In 1894, Pierre Giffard, editor of  Le Petit Journal, organised the world's first motoring competition from Paris to Rouen to publicise his newspaper, to stimulate interest in motoring and to develop French motor manufacturing. Sporting events were a tried and tested form of publicity stunt and circulation booster. The paper promoted it as "Le Petit Journal Competition for Horseless Carriages" (Le Petit Journal Concours des Voitures sans Chevaux) that were "not dangerous, easy to drive, and cheap during the journey", the main prize being for "the competitor whose car comes closest to the ideal". The "easy to drive" clause effectively precluded from the prizes (but not the event) any vehicles needing a travelling mechanic or technical assistant such as a stoker. (i.e. steam powered.)

Le Petit Journal announced prize money totalling 10,000 gold francs – 5,000 for first place, 2,000 for second, 1,500 for third; 1,000 for fourth, and 500 for fifth. The main prize was for the first eligible vehicle across the finish line in Rouen.

Entrants
See full list of 102 entrants
102 people paid the ten franc entrance fee. They ranged from practical manufacturers like Peugeot, Panhard, de Dion-Bouton, and Serpollet to amateur owners and 'over-ambitious concepts'. 78 entrants did not show up for qualifying on 18 July, which included some 25 powered by unfamiliar and improbable technologies such as "gravity" – nine; "compressed air" – five; "automatic" – three; electricity – three; gas – three; hydraulics – two; liquid, pedals, propellers, and levers. Additionally, 19 petrol-powered designs and 26 steam-powered cars, quadricycles, and tricycles did not show up at the qualifying event.

Qualifying
Qualifying was held from 19–21 July 1894, and was preceded by a public exhibition of 26 cars to Neuilly-sur-Seine on 18 July. Journalists reported great crowds and excitement throughout the routes, and at Précy-sur-Oise they finished through a triumphal arch. The  qualifying event had to be completed in under three hours to be eligible to start the main event, the  race from Paris to Rouen; 21 were selected for the main event.

Qualifying was used as a major publicity tool for both the event and the newspaper: "for our readers who want to see the cars on the roads around Paris". The 22 vehicles were split into five groups who completed complex interwoven tours of Paris and its environs, including Mantes-la-Jolie, Château de Saint-Germain-en-Laye, Flins-sur-Seine, Poissy, Triel-sur-Seine, Rambouillet, Versailles, Dampierre-en-Yvelines, Corbeil-Essonnes, Palaiseau, Précy-sur-Oise, Gennevilliers and L'Isle-Adam, Val-d'Oise. The groups were carefully balanced to ensure each included petrol and steam, a Peugeot, a Panhard & Levassor, and different seating. Le Petit Journal, on the morning of the event, still officially expected Lemoigne and his gravity-powered vehicle to participate, although he was included as an additional member of group five.

The groups that set off from Porte Maillot on Thursday 19 July were:

Itinerary one – Paris to Mantes-la-Jolie via Château de Saint-Germain-en-Laye and Flins-sur-Seine:
No. 3 de Dion, Bouton et Cie, break, six seats, steam.  – Did not qualify for Paris-Rouen.
No. 13 Panhard et Levassor, four seats, petrol  – qualified
No. 21 Letar, four seats, steam  – did not qualify
No. 30 Les fils de Peugeot frères, three seats, petrol – qualified
Itinerary two – Paris to Mantes-la-Jolie via Poissy and Triel-sur-Seine:
No. 10 Scotte, 8–10 seats, steam – qualified
No. 15 Panhard et Levassor, two seats, petrol – qualified
No. 25 Coqatrix, four seats, steam – qualified
No. 28 Les fils de Peugeot frères, four seats, petrol – qualified
No. 44 de Prandieres, six seats, system Serpollet and petrol combined  – qualified

(Note – Le Petit Journal does not show an itinerary three, presumably either a misprint or changed plan)

Itinerary four – Paris to Rambouillet via Versailles and Dampierre-en-Yvelines:
No. 7 Gautier, four seats, steam – qualified
No. 18 Archdeacon, six or seven seats, steam – qualified
No. 19 Le Blant, eight to ten seats, steam – qualified
No. 42 Le Brun, four seats, petrol – qualified
Itinerary five – Paris to Corbeil-Essonnes via Versailles and Palaiseau:
No. 4 de Dion, Victoria, four people, steam – qualified
No. 16 Quantin, six seats, petrol – did not qualify
No. 27 Les fils de Peugeot frères, two seats, petrol – qualified
No. 29 Les fils de Peugeot frères, four seats, petrol – did not qualify
No. 40 Lemoigne, four seats, 'gravity powered'. Note – did not show or was eliminated.
(Sources show three or five vehicles on this route and variance over qualification)

Itinerary six – Paris to Précy-sur-Oise via Gennevilliers and L'Isle-Adam, Val-d'Oise:
No. 12 Tenting, four seats, petrol. Note – did not qualify for Paris-Rouen.
No. 14 Panhard et Levassor, four seats, (new type) petrol – qualified
No. 24 Alfred Vacheron, two seats, petrol – did not qualify until Saturday 21st
No. 31 Les fils de Peugeot frères, break, five seats, petrol – qualified

On Friday 20 July a second qualifying event was run over two routes.
Itinerary one – Paris to Mantes-la-Jolie via Bezons, Houilles and Maisons-Laffitte.
No. 44 de Prandieres, six seats, system Serpollet and petrol combined – qualified
No. 60 Le Blant, Serpollet, nine seats, steam – qualified
No. 64 Émile Mayade, Panhard et Levassor, four seats, petrol – qualified
No. 65 Albert Lemaître, Les fils de Peugeot frères, four seats, petrol – qualified
Itinerary two – Paris to Corbeil-Essonnes
No. 61 Roger de Montais, De Montais, two seat tricycle, petrol – qualified
No. 85 Émile Roger, Benz, two seats, petrol – qualified

On Saturday 21 July a third qualifying event was run from Paris to Poissy.
No. 53 de Bourmont (de Bourmont, four seats, petrol) – qualified
No. 24 Alfred Vacheron, two seats, petrol – qualified

Race
At 8:00 am on Sunday 22 July, twenty-one qualifiers started from Porte Maillot and went via the Bois de Boulogne, Neuilly-sur-Seine, Courbevoie, Nanterre, Chatou, Le Pecq, Poissy, Triel-sur-Seine, Vaux-sur-Seine, and Meulan, to Mantes where they stopped for lunch from 12:00 pm until 1:30 pm, whence they set off to Vernon, Gaillon, Pont-de-l'Arche, and the 'Champ de Mars' at Rouen.

He finished 3 min 30 sec ahead of Albert Lemaître (Peugeot), Auguste Doriot (Peugeot) (16 min 30 sec back), Hippolyte Panhard (Panhard) (33 min 30 sec) and Émile Levassor (Panhard) (55 min 30 sec).

Prizes
On Tuesday 24 July Le Petit Journal announced the prizes :

 First prize, the Prix du Petit Journal for "the competitor whose car comes closest to the ideal" (5,000 francs) was shared equally between Panhard et Levassor and 'Les fils de Peugeot Frères'.
 Second prize, the Prix Marinoni (Owner of Le Petit Journal) (2,000 francs) was awarded to de Dion, Bouton et Cie for their "interesting steam tractor that works like a horse and gives both absolute speed and pulling power up hills".
 Third prize, the Prix Marinoni (1,500 francs) was awarded to Maurice Le Blant for his nine-seater vehicle powered by the 'systeme Serpollet'.
 Fourth prize, the Prix Marinoni (1,000 francs) was shared between two manufacturers, Alfred Vacheron (No. 24) and Le Brun (No. 42).
 Fifth prize, the Prix Marinoni (500 francs) was awarded to Roger (No. 85)

Results for Paris-Rouen

Table sources.

List of entrants

See also

 Motorsport before 1906
 Peugeot Type 5
 Peugeot Type 6/7
 Peugeot Type 8
 Paris–Bordeaux–Paris
 1896 Paris–Marseille–Paris
 Paris–Madrid race

Notes

References

Other sources
 Gallica, Online Archive, Le Petit Journal Index
 Gallica, Online Archive, Le Petit Journal 19 December 1893 – Announcement
 Gallica, Online Archive, Le Petit Journal Wednesday 18 July 1894 – Selection I
 Gallica, Online Archive, Le Petit Journal Thursday 19 July 1894 – Selection report
 Gallica, Online Archive, Le Petit Journal Friday 20 July 1894 – 
 Gallica, Online Archive, Le Petit Journal Saturday 21 July 1894 – Selection II
 Gallica, Online Archive, Le Petit Journal Sunday 22 July 1894 – Race day
 Gallica, Online Archive, Le Petit Journal Monday 23 July 1894 – Report
 Gallica, Online Archive, Le Petit Journal Tuesday 24 July 1894 – Prizes
 Gallica, Online Archive, Le Petit Journal Supplement du Dimanche. Illustre. – index
 Gallica, Online Archive, Le Petit Journal 6 August 1894
 Gallica, Online Archive, Le Petit Journal 6 August 1894. Leaf through the magazine. :) 
 The Early History of Motoring by Claude Goodman Johnson

Gallery

External links

 CC Organisation – Course Paris-Rouen
 European Motoring Museum, Drawing of the 1894 Panhard & Levassor, number 64 driven by Émile Mayade, equipped with "four-poster" draperies.
 First Competition of the Vehicles Without Horses
 Original photography by R. Girard

Auto races in France
Defunct auto racing series
1894 in sports
1894 in French motorsport
1894 establishments in France
History of Paris
Sports competitions in Paris
History of Rouen
Sport in Rouen
July 1894 sports events
Defunct sports competitions in France